Elections to the Australian Capital Territory Legislative Assembly were held on Saturday, 20 October 2001. The incumbent Liberal Party, led by Gary Humphries, was challenged by the Labor Party, led by Jon Stanhope. Candidates were elected to fill three multi-member electorates using a single transferable vote method, known as the Hare-Clark system. The result was another hung parliament. However Labor, with the largest representation in the 17-member unicameral Assembly, formed Government with the support of the ACT Greens and Democrats. Stanhope was elected Chief Minister at the first sitting of the fifth Assembly on 12 November 2001. The election was conducted by the ACT Electoral Commission and was the first time in Australia's history that an electronic voting and counting system was used for some, but not all, polling places.

Key dates

 Party registration closed: 13 September 2001
 Pre-election period commenced and nominations opened: 14 September 2001
 Rolls closed: 21 September 2001
 Nominations closed: 26 September 2001
 Nominations declared and ballot paper order determined: 27 September 2001
 Pre-poll voting commenced: 2 October 2001
 Polling day: 20 October 2001
 Scrutiny completed: 1 November 2001
 Poll declared: 5 November 2001
 Legislative Assembly formed: 12 November 2001

Overview
The incumbent centre-right Liberal Party, led by Chief Minister Gary Humphries, attempted to win election for a first time in his own right as Liberal leader, yet a third term after the Liberals had come to power in 1995. They were challenged by the opposition centre-left Labor Party, led by Jon Stanhope, who assumed the Labor leadership in March 1998. A third party, the ACT Greens, held one seat in the Assembly through sitting member, Kerrie Tucker, as well as several minor parties that had been a feature of ACT politics up until this election.

The election saw all 17 members of the Assembly face re-election, with members being elected by the Hare-Clark system of proportional representation. The Assembly is divided into three electorates: five-member Brindabella (including Tuggeranong and parts of the Woden Valley) and Ginninderra (including Belconnen and suburbs) and seven-member Molonglo (including North Canberra, South Canberra, Gungahlin, Weston Creek, and the remainder of the Woden Valley). Election dates are set in statute to occur once every four years; the government has no ability to set the election date.

Following the 1998 election outcome, the Liberals held seven seats; the opposition Labor held six seats, the Osborne independents of Paul Osborne and Dave Rugendyke holding two seats; the Greens holding one seat; and Michael Moore also holding one seat.

During 2000, Chief Minister, Kate Carnell, faced continual criticism over cost blowouts in the redevelopment of Bruce Stadium. Eventually, when faced with a vote of no confidence, Carnell resigned as Chief Minister in October 2000. Her deputy, Gary Humphries, was elected as her replacement. Carnell subsequently resigned from the Assembly on 17 October 2000 and was replaced by Jacqui Burke on 13 January 2001.

The 2001 ACT Legislative Assembly election represented a major milestone in the conduct of elections in Australia with the first use of electronic voting at polling places for parliamentary elections. This election also saw the introduction of electronic counting of ballots for the first time in the ACT.

Meninga candidacy
The 2001 campaign is perhaps best remembered for the short-lived candidacy of rugby league veteran Mal Meninga, AM. On Monday, 24 September 2001, Meninga declared his candidacy for the ACT Legislative Assembly, running for the electorate of Molonglo. Moments after announcing that he would run for election, Meninga pulled out mid-sentence: "And the thing about that is, I guess, I was a public figure and I was put on the podium where I was just a person out there . . . I'm buggered, I'm sorry, I have to resign." Subsequently, this incident led to the satirical Chaser team instituting the 'Mal Award' for their election television shows, presented to politicians "for the greatest act of political suicide during an election campaign".

Candidates

Sitting members at the time of the election are listed in bold. Tickets that elected at least one MLA are highlighted in the relevant colour. Successful candidates are indicated by an asterisk (*).

Retiring Members

Independent
 Michael Moore (Molonglo)

Brindabella
Five seats were up for election. The Labor Party was defending two seats. The Liberal Party was defending two seats (although Trevor Kaine was contesting the election as a candidate for the United Canberra Party). The Paul Osborne Independent Group was defending one seat.

Ginninderra
Five seats were up for election. The Labor Party was defending two seats. The Liberal Party was defending two seats. Independent MLA Dave Rugendyke, originally elected as an affiliate of Brindabella independent MLA Paul Osborne, was defending one seat.

Molonglo
Seven seats were up for election. The Labor Party was defending two seats. The Liberal Party was defending three seats. The Greens were defending one seat. One seat had been held by Independent MLA Michael Moore.

Results

|}

Following a full count and distribution of preferences, Labor had obtained 41.7 per cent of the vote across the ACT, with the Liberals at 31.6 per cent, the Greens at 9.1 per cent, and the Democrats at 8.0 per cent. Swings were recorded towards Labor (+14.0 per cent) and the Democrats (+2.9 per cent); the Greens vote remained unchanged in percentage terms, and a strong swing against the Liberals (-6.2 per cent). With the retirement of Michael Moore and poor polling by both Paul Osborne and Dave Rugendyke, support for independent candidates collapsed. Following distribution of all preferences, the resultant outcome was a hung parliament, with Labor winning eight seats, the Liberals winning seven seats, and the Greens and Democrats winning one seat each. The ACT Electoral Commission determined and announced the election's final results on 5 November 2001. Labor, with a majority of seats in the Assembly, formed a minority government, with the support of the Greens and Democrats.

In Brindabella, Labor gained an additional one-seat to take their tally to three seats. The Liberals retained its two seats. Labor's Bill Wood and John Hargreaves retained their seats. Labor's Karin MacDonald defeated independent sitting member, Paul Osborne. For the Liberal Party, Government Minister Brendan Smyth and backbencher Steve Pratt were both re-elected.

Both Labor and Liberal retained its two seats in Ginninderra. The Democrats won its first seat in the Assembly, with Roslyn Dundas defeating independent Dave Rugendyke. Labor leader Jon Stanhope and Labor veteran member, Wayne Berry, were both re-elected. Bill Stefaniak was re-elected, with Vicki Dunne replacing the Liberal-truend-independent, Harold Hird as the second Liberal member.

In seven-member Molonglo, the Liberals retained three seats; Labor picked up one additional seat, taking their representation from two seats to three; and the Greens retained one seat. Liberal leader, Gary Humphries and Speaker Greg Cornwell retained their seats. Helen Cross defeated Liberal colleague Jacqui Burke. For Labor, Ted Quinlan and Simon Corbell were re-elected. Katy Gallagher won the additional seat, following the retirement of long-serving independent member, Michael Moore. The Greens sitting member, Kerrie Tucker, was re-elected to the Assembly.

Electronic voting and counting system

Overview
The 2001 ACT election was a major milestone in the conduct of elections in Australia with the first use of electronic voting at polling places for parliamentary elections. This election also saw the introduction of electronic counting of all ballots for the first time in the ACT. Electronic voting and counting was introduced following the passing of the ACT Electoral Amendment Bill 2000 (No 2). This Bill allowed for electronic ballot papers, electronic capture of ballot information, electronic counting of ballots. Also covered were provisions allowing for the security of electronic voting and voting counting processes, handling of disputes, offences, publication of electronic voting statistics.

The electronic voting system used at the 2001 election was the first of its kind to be used for a parliamentary election in Australia. The system was based on the use of standard personal computers as voting terminals, with voters using a barcode to authenticate their votes. Voting terminals were linked to a server in each polling location using a secure local area network. No votes were taken or transmitted over a public network like the internet.

This was the first election which used electronic counting, which combines the counting of electronic votes and paper ballots. Votes were "captured" electronically in two ways: recorded directly by
electors through the electronic voting system, and recorded by data entry operators who entered electors' preferences marked on paper ballots into a computer system. This data-entry method of converting handwritten ballot papers into computer-readable data was not an ACT first – similar systems have been used for recent elections for the Australian Senate and the upper houses in New South Wales, Western Australia and South Australia. However, adapting this system to the Robson Rotation method of printing variations of the ballot papers was an ACT innovation, used for the first time in
Australia at the 2001 election.

2001 statistics
A total of 16,559 electronic votes were recorded at four pre-poll centres across the Territory. On polling day, another four voting centres were equipped with electronic voting facilities. The proportion of electronic votes in relation to all votes counted increased was 8.3 per cent. The ACT Electoral Commission claims that interim results for 16,559 votes using the electronic voting system were available through the Commission's website by 7:15pm, 75 minutes after the close of polls on polling night. In a review of the electronic voting and counting system, following the 2001 election, the Commission recommended an expansion of the system for the 2004 ACT general election.

Claim for recount
Following the announcement of the election result in 2001, Harold Hird, a Liberal Party candidate in the electorate of Ginninderra, sought a recount of the votes in that electorate. Hird was 55 votes behind fellow Liberal Party candidate, Vicki Dunne, at the point at which one of the two candidates had to be excluded. Hird's request for a recount was rejected by both the Electoral Commissioner and, on appeal, the full Commission. In considering the request, the Commissioner and the full Commission had regard to the level of accuracy achieved by the data entry of paper ballots and the computer count. The Commission was satisfied that the level of accuracy was so high that a recount in any form could not have improved on the accuracy of the original count, and that there was no probability that the original count had indicated that the wrong candidates had been elected, given the margins between the winning and losing candidates.

See also
 Members of the Australian Capital Territory Legislative Assembly, 2001-2004
 First Stanhope Ministry
 List of Australian Capital Territory elections

External links
 ACT Electoral Commission
 ACT Legislative Assembly - List of Members (1989–2008)

References

Elections in the Australian Capital Territory
2001 elections in Australia
October 2001 events in Australia
2000s in the Australian Capital Territory